Tougué (Pular: 𞤚𞤵𞤺𞤫𞥅) is a town located in central Guinea. It is the capital of Tougué Prefecture. In 2008, its population was estimated at  3,745.

Economy
There are deposits of bauxite near this town. Agriculture is also important, including onion farming.

See also 
 Transport in Guinea

References

Sub-prefectures of the Labé Region